Victor Langellotti (born 7 June 1995 in Monaco) is a Monegasque cyclist, who currently rides for UCI ProTeam .

Major results
2017
 2nd  Time trial, Games of the Small States of Europe
2022
 1st Stage 8 Volta a Portugal
 Vuelta a España
Held  after Stages 5–7
2023
 9th Clàssica Comunitat Valenciana 1969

Grand Tour general classification results timeline
Sources:

References

External links

1995 births
Living people
Monegasque male cyclists
European Games competitors for Monaco
Cyclists at the 2015 European Games
Cyclists at the 2019 European Games